Joseph Leopold Röckel (born London, 11 April 1838; died Vittel, Vosges, France, 20 June 1923), was a composer and music teacher. He studied at the music schools of Franz Xavier Eisenhofer, in Würzburg, and of Auguste Götze in Weimar, Germany, then left for England, and settled in Clifton, Bristol, where his songwriting was much appreciated. In 1864 he married pianist Jane Jackson (1834–1907). Besides writing songs like “Madeleine,” he composed several cantatas, such as Fair Rosamond, Ruth, The Sea Maidens, Westward Ho, Mary Stuart and The Victorian Age.

External links
Sheet music for some of Röckel's songs is archived at archive.org:  Röckel, Joseph Leopold

German composers
Romanticism
German music educators
English male musicians
1838 births
1923 deaths
Deaths in France